WLRV is a Southern Gospel formatted broadcast radio station licensed to Lebanon, Virginia.  WLRV serves Lebanon and Russell County, Virginia.  WLRV is owned and operated by Spring City Baptist Church.

History
WLRV fell silent on June 1, 2016 due to financial problems and family illness.  The station was purchased by Spring City Baptist Church, and returned to the airwaves in May 2017 with a Southern Gospel format.

References

External links
 Victory Radio 1380 WLRV Online
 

1974 establishments in Virginia
Southern Gospel radio stations in the United States
Radio stations established in 1974
LRV